The 1939 West Tennessee State Teachers Tigers football team was an American football team that represented the West Tennessee State Teachers College (now known as the University of Memphis) as a member of the Southern Intercollegiate Athletic Association during the 1939 college football season. In their first season under head coach Cecil C. Humphreys, West Tennessee State Teachers compiled a 3–8 record.

Schedule

References

West Tennessee State Teachers
Memphis Tigers football seasons
West Tennessee State Teachers Tigers football